Laevidentaliidae is a family of relatively large tusk shells, scaphopod mollusks in the order Dentaliida.

Genera
 Laevidentalium Cossmann, 1888

References

 Scarabino V., 1995 Scaphopoda of the tropical Pacific and Indian Oceans, with description of 3 new genera and 42 new species P. Bouchet (ed) Résultats des Campagnes MUSORSTOM, Volume 14 Mémoires du Muséum National d'Histoire Naturelle, 167 189-379
 Palmer C. P. 1974 A supraspecific classification of the scaphopod Mollusca. The Veliger 17: 115-123

Scaphopods